The 1972–73 St. Louis Blues season was the St. Louis Blues' sixth season in the National Hockey League (NHL).

Offseason

NHL Draft

Regular season

Final standings

Schedule and results

Playoffs

Despite having a 32–34–12 record, the Blues managed to clinch a playoff spot. However, they lost in the first round to the Chicago Blackhawks 4–1.

(W1) Chicago Black Hawks vs. (W4) St. Louis Blues

Player statistics

Regular season
Scoring

Goaltending

Playoffs
Scoring

Goaltending

See also
1972–73 NHL season

References

 
 Blues on Hockey Database

St. Louis Blues seasons
St. Louis
St. Louis
St Louis
St Louis